Danny Kladis (February 10, 1917 – April 26, 2009) was an American racecar driver. He was born in Crystal City, Missouri and died at Joliet, Illinois. 92-year-old Kladis was the oldest living Indy 500 starter at the time of his death.

Racing career
Kladis started racing in midget cars in 1935. He stopped racing in the 1940s when all racing in the United States stopped for World War II. During the war, he was a pilot in the United States Army. After the war, he started in the 1946 Indianapolis 500 for Andy Granatelli and finished 21st. He drove 50 laps as a relief driver for Spider Webb in the 1954 Indianapolis 500. Kladis attempted to make the field until the 1957 Indianapolis 500 but was unsuccessful.

Career awards
Kladis was inducted in the National Midget Auto Racing Hall of Fame in 2007.

World Championship career summary
The Indianapolis 500 was part of the FIA World Championship from 1950 through 1960. Drivers competing at Indy during those years were credited with World Championship points and participation. In the 1954 Indianapolis 500, Danny Kladis drove in relief of Spider Webb. As a result of this shared ride, Kladis participated in 1 World Championship race but scored no World Championship points.

Personal life 
Kladis was the father of seven children: George, Joanne, Carole, Ciciela, Christopher, Danny Jr, and Michael.

Racing record

Indy 500 results

* shared drive with Spider Webb

Complete Formula One World Championship results
(key)

References

1917 births
2009 deaths
Indianapolis 500 drivers
People from Crystal City, Missouri
Racing drivers from Missouri
United States Army Air Forces pilots of World War II